The Nine Mile Portage was a trail which connects Kempenfelt Bay of Lake Simcoe, Ontario, to Willow Creek, a tributary of the Nottawasaga River that flows to Wasaga Beach on Georgian Bay. The city of Barrie plans to make it possible to walk the original route of the trail, but at present no public right-of-way exists.

John Franklin 'fix[ed] the longitude and latitude of the “Nottawassaga Portage” at 44º22’55"N and 79º53’41"W' during his second overland expedition to the Arctic Ocean.

See also
 Lake Simcoe
 Igopogo
 Wasaga Beach

References

Portages in Canada